The Baltimore Canaries played their first season in 1872 as a member of the National Association of Professional Base Ball Players. They finished second in the league with a record of 35–19. Outfielder Lip Pike led the NA in home runs, with 7, and runs batted in, with 60. Pitcher Bobby Mathews paced the circuit in strikeouts. Baltimore's other pitcher, Cherokee Fisher, led in earned run average.

Several of the team's players were later suspended from baseball for fixing games; Bill Craver, George Hall, and Dick Higham were banned for life.

Regular season

Season standings

Record vs. opponents

Roster

Player stats

Batting

Starters by position
Note: Pos = Position; G = Games played; AB = At bats; H = Hits; Avg. = Batting average; HR = Home runs; RBI = Runs batted in

Other batters
Note: G = Games played; AB = At bats; H = Hits; Avg. = Batting average; HR = Home runs; RBI = Runs batted in

Pitching

Starting pitchers
Note: G = Games pitched; IP = Innings pitched; W = Wins; L = Losses; ERA = Earned run average; SO = Strikeouts

References
1872 Baltimore Canaries season at Baseball Reference

Baltimore Canaries seasons
Baltimore Canaries Season, 1872
1872 in American sports
Baltimore Canaries